The Deception of the Thrush: A Beginners' Guide to ProjeKcts was an album released by the band King Crimson in 1999. It contains tracks from the box set / live album The ProjeKcts.

Track listing 
 "Masque 1" (P3) – 5:31
 "Masque 2" (P3) – 1:44
 "Masque 3" (P3) – 5:22
 "Masque 4" (P3) – 3:10
 "Masque 5" (P3) – 4:33
 "Masque 6" (P3) – 2:40
 "Masque 7" (P3) – 6:19
 "4 i 1" (P1) – 5:55
 "2 ii 3" (P1) – 3:09
 "4 ii 4" (P1) – 5:37
 "Sus-tayn-Z" (P2) – 6:52
 "The Deception of the Thrush" (P3/P4) – 8:09
 "Ghost (Part 1)" (P4) – 8:02
 "Ghost (Part 2)" (P4) – 6:28

Personnel
 Adrian Belew (Roland V-Drums) – P2
 Bill Bruford (drums and percussion) – P1
 Robert Fripp (guitar) – P1, P2, P3, P4
 Trey Gunn (touch guitar, talker) – P1, P2, P3, P4
 Tony Levin (Bass guitar, Didgeridoo, Synthesizer) – P1, P4
 Pat Mastelotto (Electronic drum and Push-button) – P3, P4

References

Albums produced by Robert Fripp
1999 compilation albums
1999 live albums
King Crimson compilation albums
King Crimson live albums
Discipline Global Mobile albums